João Sousa was the defending champion.
Blaž Kavčič won the tournament by defeating Sergiy Stakhovsky 6–3, 2–6, 6–2 in the final.

Seeds

Draw

Finals

Top half

Bottom half

References
 Main Draw
 Qualifying Draw

Franken Challenge - Singles
2012 Singles